Serrapinnus is a genus of characins from tropical South America.

Species
There are currently 15 recognized species of this genus: 
 Serrapinnus aster L. R. Malabarba & Jerep, 2014 
 Serrapinnus calliurus (Boulenger, 1900)
 Serrapinnus gracilis (Géry, 1960)
 Serrapinnus heterodon (C. H. Eigenmann, 1915)
 Serrapinnus kriegi (O. Schindler, 1937)
 Serrapinnus littoris (Géry, 1960)
 Serrapinnus lucindai L. R. Malabarba & Jerep, 2014 
 Serrapinnus microdon (C. H. Eigenmann, 1915)
 Serrapinnus micropterus (C. H. Eigenmann, 1907)
 Serrapinnus notomelas (C. H. Eigenmann, 1915)
 Serrapinnus piaba (Lütken, 1875)
 Serrapinnus potiguar Jerep & L. R. Malabarba, 2014 
 Serrapinnus sterbai Zarske, 2012 
 Serrapinnus tocantinensis L. R. Malabarba & Jerep, 2014 
 Serrapinnus zanatae Jerep, Camelier & L. R. Malabarba, 2016

References

Characidae
Fish of South America